Telmatobius marmoratus, the marbled water frog, is a vulnerable species of frog in the family Telmatobiidae. The most widespread species in the genus, it is found in the Andean highlands of Bolivia, northern Chile and southern Peru. It may also occur in northwestern Argentina, but the taxonomic position of this population is unclear. This semiaquatic frog is found in and near streams, rivers, waterfalls, lakes and ponds.

It is very closely related to the larger and less widespread T. gigas, and they might be conspecific. Another close relative (but clearly a separate species) is the Titicaca water frog (T. culeus) and both species are found in Lake Titicaca.

References

marmoratus
Amphibians of the Andes
Amphibians of Bolivia
Amphibians of Chile
Amphibians of Peru
Taxonomy articles created by Polbot
Amphibians described in 1841
Taxa named by André Marie Constant Duméril
Taxa named by Gabriel Bibron